Moneris (formerly "Moneris Solutions") is a Canadian financial technology company that specializes in payment processing.

Moneris was established in December 2000 as a joint venture between the Royal Bank of Canada and Bank of Montreal. The company is headquartered in the Toronto suburb of Etobicoke, Ontario and has offices in Sackville, New Brunswick, Burnaby, British Columbia, Montreal, Quebec, and Calgary, Alberta.

Moneris’s U.S. operations (formerly known as Harris Bank Merchant Services/The Charge-It-System) were based in Schaumburg, Illinois, until being sold in November 2016 to Vantiv.

History

Moneris was first established in December 2000 as a 50/50 joint venture between RBC and BMO. It became the first Canadian appropriator to offer both Visa and Mastercard merchant accounts in one single point of contact. Moneris was also the first Canadian payment processor to use an integrated point-of-sale system, so businesses could have the proceeds from all card transactions flow into a single deposit account. After its first 1.5 years, the company reported having processed more than 2 billion transactions in Canada.

In October 2003, Moneris acquired Ernex Marketing Technologies, an industry leader in providing privately branded loyalty programs and stored-value gift cards.

In February 2004, Moneris purchased the merchant portfolio of RBC Centura to become the payment provider for all existing and new merchant accounts tied to the bank. The acquisition supported the company’s expansion into the United States with merchants located in North Carolina, South Carolina, Virginia, Georgia, and Florida.

On June 6, 2005, Moneris became the first payment processor in Canada to process an Interac Online transaction. This marked the first opportunity for Canadians to pay for goods and services purchased on the Internet directly from their bank account. Prior to Interac Online, the primary option for Canadians to pay for purchases online was through a credit card.

On June 27, 2005, Moneris processed the first full data EMV chip transaction in Canada with a VISA certified chip. This was the first card transaction in Canada that required inserting a card into a chip reader slot on the terminal, rather than use a swipe feature. On August 27, 2007, the company announced it was among the first acquirers in Canada to be certified by all of Interac, Mastercard and VISA to provide chip technology in Canada.

In April 2008, Moneris acquired Keycorp Canada, one of the largest providers of POS support services in Canada, to expand its portfolio of merchants.

In March 2013, Moneris processed the first Near Field Communication (NFC) mobile debit transaction in Canada. Using Interac Flash, Canadians could now make contactless debit transactions with their mobile device. The debut of NFC payment in Canada was performed in a McDonald’s restaurant using a Blackberry smartphone.

In November 2014, Moneris became the first Canadian acquirer to offer a full processing solution for the UnionPay card portfolio.

In November 2016, US-based payment processor Vantiv announced that it had acquired Moneris USA for $425 million USD. Vantiv (now under Fidelity National Information Services Inc.) took over all Moneris USA operations including merchant accounts and other business relationships.

Products

Devices 
In June 2014, Moneris launched Payd Pro, a point of sale (POS) solution that can run on a smartphone. The device was promoted as Canada’s first mobile POS solution to accept Interac debit and credit, as well as the first to include EMV chip and PIN and contactless payment technology. The device came in the form of a PIN pad, which connects to Moneris’ Payd app using a Bluetooth connection. Payd Pro was targeted at small businesses to accept payments from anywhere.

In April 2019, Moneris introduced Moneris Core, a proprietary software used to power its next-generation payment terminals. With Moneris Core, Moneris became the first major payment provider in Canada to provide its own propriety payment experience.

In September 2020, Moneris launched Moneris Go, using the A920 Android POS mobile terminal from PAX Technology. The mobile device accepts card and contactless payments and can integrate with third-party apps. The device was announced as the company’s first smart terminal and suitable for businesses of all sizes.

Moneris is the only acquirer in Canada to offer a unified bilingual experience for English and French users across all of its point-of-sale terminals.

Services 
In October 2018, Moneris launched its digital analytics tool Offlinx to measure the effect digital ad spending can have on in-store purchases for retail businesses. The service is powered by a tagging mechanism that anonymously links browsing data to transactions that process through Moneris' national payment network.

The company's data services has publicly shared findings to disclose Canadian consumer spending habits during the 2019 NBA Finals,  the King Street Pilot Project, and holiday seasons.

Business

Operations 
Moneris processes more than 3 billion transactions a year for over 350,000 merchant locations, and employs more than 1,900 people across North America. While based in Toronto, the company has offices in Sackville NB, Burnaby BC, Montreal QC, and Calgary AB.

Growth 
In 2016, Moneris began a partnership with Planet Payment, a provider of international and multi-currency payment processing services. Payment Planet’s currency conversion technology enables Moneris merchants to offer international customers the choice to pay in their home currency.

In 2018, Moneris began a partnership with Kount, an online fraud protection platform. The Moneris Kount partnership provides businesses with fraud management tools to determine valid and fraudulent orders.

In 2020, Moneris began a partnership with Bookmark, a Toronto-based website building startup, to provide web-building tools for small businesses. Bookmark uses an artificial design assistant to assist users in designing an ecommerce website for their business.

Moneris is partnered with all major card brands in Canada, including Interac, Visa, Mastercard, American Express, Discover, and Union Pay. In 2015, Moneris announced support for Apple Pay in its contactless-capable terminals. In 2017, Moneris announced support for Google Pay.

Moneris is the payment provider for such businesses as McDonald’s Canada, Indigo Books, IKEA Canada, and the Canadian Federation of Independent Grocers.

References

Financial services companies of Canada
Payment service providers
Joint ventures
Royal Bank of Canada
Bank of Montreal
2000 establishments in Canada
Financial services companies established in 2000
Companies established in 2000
Companies based in Etobicoke